Syed Mohammed Izhar Ashraf was a Sunni Alim from India. He was the relative of Sajjada Nashin of Syed Ashraf Jahangir Semnani and Chief Patron of All India Ulema and Mashaikh Board. He died on 22 February 2012 at age 78 while receiving treatment at the Ismailia Hospital.  The Ashraf's are the spritiual descendants of the Sufi saint, Syed Ashraf Jahangir Semnani (d.1386), who had settled in Kichhauchha, U.P., India, after relinquishing his throne in Semnan (Iran), the Ashrafi Family is one of the most revered and authentic families of Hashemite Sayyids residing in India, they trace their lineage to Shaykh 'Abd al-Qadir al-Jilani, the founder of the Qadri tariqa.

Education
He completed his primary education at Kichhauchha Sharif. After that he went to Ahle sunnat Al Jamiatul Ashrafia Mubarakpur for Dars-i Nizami. He completed his Fazilat course in 1959. He established many madrasas all over India. Ashrafia Izhar-uloloom Machipur is a famous Madras founded by him. Later, he joined Jamia Naeemia Moradabad to teach Islamic education to students.

Works
He had deep interest in Islamic poetry. A compilation of his Nat, Manquabat and Ghazal has published as "Izhare Haquiqat".
He established following Madrasas: –
1. Madrasa Mukhtaruloloom chirayya chowk Baisi Purnia.Bihar
2. Madrasa Ashrafia Izharuloloom Bahadurganj Purnia, Bihar
3. Madrasa Ahsrafia Izharuloloom Khushamadpura Malegaon Maharashtra
4. Madrasa Ashrafia Gulshane Kabir Bhagalpur, Bihar

See also 
 Hashmi Miya

References

Indian imams
Indian Sufis
Hanafis
Chishti Order
People from Ambedkar Nagar district
Indian Sunni Muslim scholars of Islam
1935 births
2012 deaths